Thomas Le Ban Kennedy (1813-1900)  (1815-1900) was Dean of Clogher from 1873 to 1899.

Kennedy was born in Dublin and educated at Trinity College, Dublin.
He was ordained in 1836 and served curacies in Aghancon, Ballymore Eustace and Sutton, Cheshire. He  was the incumbent at Kilmore. Later he was Examining Chaplain to The Archbishop of Armagh.

His sons also became priests: one was Bishop of Chota Nagpur from 1926 to 1936 while another was Dean of Christ Church Cathedral, Dublin from 1921 to 1938.

References

Irish Anglicans
Alumni of Trinity College Dublin
Deans of Clogher
1813 births

1900 deaths